Snoj is a surname of Slovene origin. Notable people with the surname include:

Franc Snoj (1902-1962), Slovenian politician and economist
Jože Snoj (born 1934), Slovenian poet, novelist, journalist and essayist
Luka Snoj (born 1990), Slovenian professional 3x3 basketball player
Marko Snoj (born 1959), Slovenian Indo-Europeanist, Slavist, Albanologist, lexicographer, and etymologist
Niko Snoj (born 1990), Slovenian footballer
Ivan Snoj (1923-1994), Croatian handball coach and international referee

Slovene-language surnames